Nahedh Al-Murdh (born 30 March 1970) is a Kuwaiti fencer. He competed in the team épée event at the 1988 Summer Olympics.

References

External links
 

1970 births
Living people
Kuwaiti male épée fencers
Olympic fencers of Kuwait
Fencers at the 1988 Summer Olympics